UnREAL is an American drama series that premiered on June 1, 2015, on Lifetime. Inspired by Sarah Gertrude Shapiro's award-winning independent short film Sequin Raze, the series was created by Marti Noxon and Shapiro, and stars Shiri Appleby as Rachel Goldberg, a young reality television producer pushed by her unscrupulous boss (Constance Zimmer) to swallow her integrity and do anything it takes to drum up salacious show content. Craig Bierko, Jeffrey Bowyer-Chapman, and Josh Kelly also star in supporting roles. 

Season one features Freddie Stroma as Adam Cromwell, the "suitor" of Everlasting, while Johanna Braddy, Nathalie Kelley, Ashley Scott, and Breeda Wool starred as the contestants. Aline Elasmar also starred as a producer on the series. Season two features B.J. Britt as Darius Beck, the "suitor" of Everlasting, while Monica Barbaro, Denée Benton, Kim Matula, and Meagan Tandy star as the contestants. The second season also stars Michael Rady as a new producer on the series, and Gentry White as Darius' manager.

Series overview

Episodes

Season 1 (2015)

Season 2 (2016)

Season 3 (2018)

Season 4 (2018)

References

External links
 

Lists of American comedy-drama television series episodes